Rashidpur Garhi is a census town in Bijnor district in the Indian state of Uttar Pradesh.

Demographics
As of the 2001 Census of India, Rashidpur Garhi had a population of 6,363. Males constitute 54% of the population and females 46%. Rashidpur Garhi has a literacy rate of 75%, higher than the national average of 59.5%: male literacy is 81%, and female literacy is 68%. In Rashidpur Garhi, 12% of the population is under 6 years of age.

References

Cities and towns in Bijnor district